Warfare Machines is the last Deinonychus album made, after the band disbanded in September 2008. It was released by My Kingdom Music.

Track listing
All songs written by Marco Kehren.
Krematorium	03:06	
Carpet Bombing	03:23	
Manoeuvre East	04:16	
NaPola	        04:45	
MG-34	        04:11	
False Flag	05:25	
Nerve Agent	04:56	
Morphium	03:11

Personnel
Marco Kehren: Guitars, Vocals
Jürgen Bartsch: Bass
Giuseppe Orlando: Drums, Percussion

Artwork and layout
Eric Massicotte

References 

Metal Archives

2007 albums
Deinonychus (band) albums